The Great Plains toad (Anaxyrus cognatus) is a relatively large species of true toad native to central North America.

Distribution
The amphibian is native throughout the Canadian Prairies (northern Great Plains) in southern Alberta, Manitoba, and Saskatchewan; and into northern Mexico in the Sonoran Desert and Mexican Plateau.

Description
The Great Plains toad is grey, brown, and green in color, with darker colored blotching. Its primary diet is various species of cutworms. It prefers grassland habitat with loose soil that is easy to burrow in. Breeding occurs throughout the spring and summer months, most often immediately after heavy rainfall. In dry areas it may only emerge from its burrow for a few weeks when conditions are right, and usually at night, but in areas with permanent water bodies and abundant rain it may be active all day. Its mating call is a very loud, harsh chirping noise repeated many times, very fast.

Ecology
The great plains toad feeds a range of insects such as lepidopterans, dipterans, hymenopterans, coleopterans, ants, and termites. The toad is preyed upon by the plains garter snake (Thamnophis radix), among others. It uses chemoreceptors to sense chemical cues left by the snake.

The great plains toad occur in deserts, grasslands, semi-desert shrublands, open floodplains, and agricultural areas. When inactive they burrow underground. Breeding takes place in temporary water bodies such as rain pools, flooded areas, and ponds; they can also use margins of reservoirs. The eggs and larvae develop in shallow water and metamorphose after 17 to 45 days.

Conservations
The Great Plains toad has wide distribution and is not considered threatened, although it may suffer from road kills, farming, and suburban sprawl, increased droughts, and urbanization.

References

Further sources

Herps of Texas: Bufo cognatus

External links

 IUCN Red List.org: Anaxyrus cognatus (Great Plains Toad)

Great Plains
Amphibians of Canada
Amphibians of Mexico
Amphibians of the United States
Great Plains toad
Fauna of Northern Mexico
Fauna of the Plains-Midwest (United States)
Fauna of the Western United States
Fauna of the Southwestern United States
Fauna of the Colorado Desert
Fauna of the Sonoran Desert
Amphibians described in 1822
Least concern biota of the United States